The Congo national under-17 football team is the national U-17 football team of the Republic of the Congo and is run by the Fédération Congolaise de Football. The team competes in the UNIFFAC Cup, Africa U-17 Cup of Nations and FIFA U-17 World Cup.

Competitive record

FIFA U-17 World Cup record

Africa U-17 Cup of Nations record

CAF U-16 and U-17 World Cup Qualifiers record 

*Draws include knockout matches decided on penalty kicks.

African national under-17 association football teams
Congo national football team